Clint Jude Easton (born 1 October 1977 in Barking) is an English professional footballer who is unattached.

Career

Club career
Easton started his career at Watford; making nearly 80 appearances in seven years at the club and helping them reach the Premier League in the 1999–2000 season. Easton scored twice for Watford; once in the league against York City and once in the League Cup against Wigan Athletic. During this time he represented England at under-20 level twice during the 1997 FIFA World Youth Championship. He moved to Norwich City in June 2001 for a fee that had the potential of being £100,000. Easton played for Norwich in the 2002 Division One play-off final, scoring a penalty in the shoot-out (which Norwich lost 4–2) after the match had ended 1–1. He played in just over 50 matches for the Canaries before being released in the summer of 2004. He contributed ten league appearances during Norwich's 2003/04 season after which they were promoted to the Premier League as First Division champions.

Easton was signed by Wycombe manager Tony Adams in July 2004 and played regularly in the left midfield position. However, with the arrival of John Gorman as manager in November 2004, he was more regularly used in a left full back position. Despite this, Easton still managed to score three goals in the 2005–06 season, which included both goals in a 2-1 extra time win over Dagenham & Redbridge in the Football League Trophy.

On 29 June 2006, it was announced that Easton had signed a one-year contract with Gillingham, with the option of a further year.

He made his debut for Gillingham in a 2–1 League Cup defeat away to Millwall on 22 August and scored his first goal in a 2–1 home win on 12 September, also against Millwall. On 8 May, Gillingham announced they had released Easton.

On 19 July 2007 he signed for Hereford United, going on to score in his second game. He added a further two goals as Hereford gained promotion to League One. He did not feature for the Bulls at all in 2009, and was released by mutual consent on 3 April 2009.

Easton signed on with Ebbsfleet United on 23 October 2009. In the 2010–2011 season Easton experienced promotion with Ebbsfleet from the Conference South to the Conference National. However the following season was injury plagued and at the end of the campaign Easton was released.

International career
Easton represented England U20 in the 1997 FIFA World Youth Championship in Malaysia. He earned two caps by featuring in the group games against Ivory Coast and United Arab Emirates.

Honours
Norwich City
 Football League First Division: 2003–04

Ebbsfleet United
 Football Conference South play-off winners: 
 2010–2011

Career statistics

References

External links
Hereford United profile

Career information at ex-canaries.co.uk

1977 births
Footballers from Barking, London
Living people
Association football midfielders
English footballers
Watford F.C. players
Norwich City F.C. players
Gillingham F.C. players
Wycombe Wanderers F.C. players
Hereford United F.C. players
Ebbsfleet United F.C. players
English Football League players
Premier League players
England youth international footballers